The ABICOMP Character Set was an encoded repertoire of characters used in Brazil. It was devised by the Associação Brasileira de Indústria de Computadores, a Brazilian computer industry association defunct in 1992. It was used on Brazilian-made computers and several printers brands. This code page is known by Star printers and FreeDOS as Code page 3848.

Coverage
The ABICOMP Character Set obviously contained the characters to cover Portuguese. It also contained characters to cover other languages such as Spanish, French, Italian and German. However, the quotation marks "«" and "»" for (European) Portuguese, (European) Spanish, French and Italian are missing.

This character set was different from the Brazilian Standard BraSCII, which was very similar to ISO 8859-1. Although once very used in Brazil, this character set became less and less used because of the ubiquity of other character sets (ISO 8859-1 and later Unicode).

Character set

References

Character sets